Humber—Port au Port—St. Barbe (formerly known as Humber—St. Barbe) was a federal electoral district in Newfoundland and Labrador, Canada, that was represented in the House of Commons of Canada from 1979 to 1988.

This riding was created in the 1976 redistribution as "Humber—St. Barbe" from parts of Humber—St. George's—St. Barbe riding. The name of the electoral district was changed to "Humber—Port au Port—St. Barbe" in 1978.

It was abolished in the 1987 redistribution when it was redistributed into Burin—St. George's and Humber—St. Barbe—Baie Verte ridings.

Members of Parliament

This riding elected the following Members of Parliament:

Election results

See also 

 List of Canadian federal electoral districts
 Past Canadian electoral districts

External links 
 Riding history for Humber—St. Barbe (1976–1978) from the Library of Parliament
 Riding history for Humber—Port au Port—St. Barbe (1978–1987) from the Library of Parliament

Former federal electoral districts of Newfoundland and Labrador